The Girl Who Chased Away Sorrow (1999) is a book by Ann Turner, part of the Dear America book series, fictional diaries of teenage girls during different parts of American history.

It was released in 1999 in paperback and 2003 in hardcover. The full title is: Girl Who Chased Away Sorrow, The Diary of Sarah Nita, a Navajo Girl – it is part of the Dear America series. It is the story of the removal of the Navajos from their land by the U.S. Government – a 400-mile (640 km) forced winter march to Fort Sumner.

The story starts when Sarah Nita and her granddaughter, who is also called Sarah Nita, sit in the shade of their hogan. Sarah Nita (the grandmother) wants her daughter to write her story so her granddaughter gets out the book the white teacher gave to her and starts writing. The first sentence of the book is "My mother bends over the plants near the red mesa..." It tells how Sara Nita's parents are worried because of the white men and how they are trying to steal the Diné's (the Navajo) land.

Editions

1999 American novels
1999 children's books
American children's novels
American young adult novels
Children's historical novels
Native Americans in popular culture
Fictional diaries
Novels set in New Mexico
Novels set in the 1860s
Fiction set in 1863
Navajo history